Chocerady is a municipality and village in Benešov District in the Central Bohemian Region of the Czech Republic. It has about 1,300 inhabitants.

Administrative parts
Villages of Komorní Hrádek, Samechov, Vestec and Vlkovec are administrative parts of Chocerady.

Geography
It lies in the Benešov Uplands. The Sázava River flows through the municipality.

History
The first written mention of Chocerady is from 1250. The Komorní Hrádek Castle was first documented in 1412 and in 1525, it became the administrative centre of the estate. From 1554 to 1773, it was owned by the Waldstein family.

Transport
The D1 motorway from Prague to Brno passes along the western and southern municipal border just outside the municipal territory.

Chocerady is located on the local railway line leading from Čerčany to Ledeč nad Sázavou.

Sights
The landmark of the centre of Chocerady is the Church of the Assumption of the Virgin Mary. It was a Gothic church from the 14th century, rebuilt in the Renaissance style in the second half of the 16th century, and then in the Baroque style in the early 18th century.

The Komorní Lhotka Castle was an old medieval castle from the 14th century, which was rebuilt and modernized in the Renaissance style during the rule of Jaroslav of Šelmberk between 1525 and 1550, further modifications were made in the 18th century. Today the castle houses the Education and Training Centre of the Ministry of Defense.

References

External links

Villages in Benešov District